Anthracite is a ghost town located within Banff National Park in southern Alberta, Canada. It is named after the anthracite variety of coal.

History 

Anthracite existed from 1886 to 1904, during which time extensive coal mining operations were carried out by the Canadian Anthracite Coal Company in the surrounding Banff National Park, which is now a World Heritage Site as defined by the United Nations. The community was one of many that sprang up around the building sites of the Canadian Pacific Railway after workers accidentally stumbled upon some hot springs in nearby Banff. By 1887, the Anthracite's population had grown to 300 and most of the community's residents originated from the eastern United States. It consisted of one general store, one hardware store, one hotel, one pool hall, one restaurant and a barber shop. Anthracite became a hotspot for illegal activities; prostitution and the illegal consumption of alcohol were commonplace The local Justice of the Peace brought the most popular brothel owner in Anthracite before a court and fined her the then-extraordinary amount of $200 for liquor sale violations. After much bad luck during the local mine's operation, the Canadian Anthracite Coal Company closed the mine in 1890. It was reopened the next year when W. H. McNeill agreed to finance the coal company, but after a series of floods and more bad luck, McNeill moved his operations to nearby Canmore. Anthracite was mostly deserted by 1904. It recorded a population of only 25 in the 1911 Canadian census. By the 1930s, mining in the surrounding area was banned by the government.

Today 
In 1997, John Pearson, a former Parks Canada employee and last living resident of Anthracite revealed to a Banff newspaper that he had heard a rumour in the 1960s that a child had drowned in the nearby Cascade River in 1883 and that the child's body was buried in the Anthracite area. A government investigation followed and authorities concluded that it was probable that there was an unmarked grave in the community and marked the burial site with a plaque.

References 

1886 establishments in Alberta
1904 disestablishments in Alberta
Banff National Park
Ghost towns in Alberta
Localities in Improvement District No. 9
Populated places established in 1886